Censorship in Afghanistan is a book by Hazara poet and journalist Kamran Mir Hazar.  The book is written in the Dari language, and is the first book to explore the systematic suppression of free speech in Afghanistan that has been a feature of its ruling authorities for hundreds of years.  Norwegian publisher IP Plans has published this book.

References

External links 
 Dari version of the book Censorship in Afghanistan, PDF format

 
2011 non-fiction books
Books about Afghanistan
Works about freedom of expression
Hazaragi-language books
Political books